Antras may refer to 

Communes in France
 Antras, Ariège, in the Ariège department
 Antras, Gers, in the Gers department

Additionally, the following people have Antras a surname:
Pol Antràs (b. 1975), Catalan economist